Émile Charles Baillargeon-Laberge is a Canadian professional wrestler and taekwondo practitioner, currently signed to Impact Wrestling, where he performs under the ring name "Speedball" Mike Bailey. He is a former X Division Champion.

He is a former two-time IWS World Heavyweight Champion and two-time KO-D Tag Team Champion. Bailey was also the winner of CZW's 2015 Best of the Best, DDT's 2016 DNA Grand Prix, RevPro's 2021 British J Cup and PWG's 2023 Battle of Los Angeles tournaments.

Professional wrestling career

Independent circuit (2006–present)
Bailey made his professional wrestling debut at a Federation de Lutte Quebecoise house show from January 6, 2006 as Mike Sydal, where he teamed up with Bouncer and Brad Foley in a losing effort to Alextreme, Sheik Tank Ali and Sweet Pete in a six-man tag team match. He is known for working with various wrestling promotions and would often compete under the nickname of Speedball.

International Wrestling Syndicate (2009–present)
Bailey made his IWS debut on October 1, 2009 in a tag team victory with Brian Kirkland, defeating 2.0 (Jagged & Shane Matthews) at Le Skratch in Laval. At Scarred 4 Life, on September 20, 2014, Bailey won the IWS World Heavyweight Championship against The Green Phantom. At Un F'N Sanctioned on March 28, 2015 at Corona Theatre, Bailey defeated Hallowicked and Jesse Neal in a Triple Threat Match. On September 5 at Scarred 4 Life, he retained the IWS World Heavyweight Championship against Jack Evans. On March 5, 2016 at Un F'N Sanctioned held at Métropolis, Black Dynomite won the IWS World Heavyweight Championship in a 4-Way Match versus Rey Mysterio, Jack Evans and Bailey. On September 9, 2018, Bailey defeated Psicosis and Argenis in a 3-Way Dance, at an IWS vs AAA spot show for the Montreal Mercado del Taco. On March 23, 2019, IWS celebrated its 20th anniversary with Un F'N Sanctioned at MTelus, where Tajiri with Mikey Whipwreck defeated Bailey. On February 8, 2020 at Praise the Violence, Matt Angel defeated Bailey in an IWS World Heavyweight Championship Ladder Match. On September 4, 2021 at Blood, Sweat & Beers, Bailey defeated Matt Angel in an IWS Title Match, winning his second IWS World Heavyweight Championship. On June 25, 2022 at Hardcore Heat, Matt Falco defeated Bailey for the IWS World Heavyweight Championship. Bailey has taught seminars and until moving to the United States, was part of the IWS Training Centre coaching staff.

Capital City Championship Combat (2010–present)
Bailey worked for the Canadian promotion Capital City Championship Combat, where he debuted on May 1, 2010 at C4 Stand Alone 2010 in a losing effort against Player Uno. He teamed up with Kevin Steen at C4 Domination 2K11 on April 30, 2011 to defeat Josh Alexander and Michael Von Payton (who replaced an injured Rahim Ali) for the C4 Tag Team Championship. Bailey worked with other infamous wrestling personalities, such as in a six-way match from C4 Crossing The Line 5 on June 16, 2012, where he competed against Josh Alexander, Michael Elgin, Scotty O'Shea, Stu Grayson and Tyson Dux for the C4 Championship, coming in unsuccessfully. He eventually won the title at C4 Crossing The Line 6 on June 15, 2013 in a three-way match also involving Josh Alexander and the champion Scotty O'Shea. On September 18, 2021 at Fighting Back X, Bailey defeated Daniel Garcia for his second C4 Championship. On November 12, 2021 at Never Say Never, Bailey defeated Kevin Blackwood for the C4 Underground Championship in a Title vs Title Match.

Combat Zone Wrestling (2014–2016)
At the Combat Zone Wrestling's New Heights 2014 event from July 12, he unsuccessfully challenged Biff Busick for the CZW World Heavyweight Championship. At CZW Night Of Infamy 2014  on November 8, he teamed up with Buxx Belmar and unsuccessfully challenged OI4K (Dave Crist and Jake Crist) for the CZW World Tag Team Championship. On October 18, 2014 event CZW Tangled Web 7, he unsuccessfully challenged Shane Strickland for the CZW Wired Championship. At CZW Cage Of Death XVI, he participated in a six-man scramble match, a qualifier for the Best Of The Best Tournament, where he competed against the winner Jonathan Gresham, A. R. Fox, Caleb Konley, David Starr and Alex Colon. At CZW Deja Vu 2015 on March 14, Bailey unsuccessfully challenged Joe Gacy for the CZW Wired Championship. Their feud continued until CZW Proving Grounds 2015 from May 9, where he managed to defeat Gacy, but by disqualification, therefore not succeeding in winning the title. His last match in CZW was a loss against Sami Callihan at CZW Seventeen from February 13, 2016.

Pro Wrestling Guerrilla (2015–2016)
Bailey made his debut for the Southern California promotion Pro Wrestling Guerrilla (PWG) at From Out of Nowhere on February 27, 2015, losing to Biff Busick in his first match. At Mystery Vortex III, Bailey answered Roderick Strong's open challenge for the PWG World Championship, but failed to win the title. Bailey picked up his first win in PWG by defeating Chris Hero at Threemendous IV. He participated in the Battle of Los Angeles tournament, where he managed to reach to the final by defeating Drew Galloway in the first round, Will Ospreay in the quarterfinals and Tommy End in the semifinals. Bailey competed against Chris Hero and Zack Sabre Jr. in a three-way elimination match in the final, where he was the first man to be eliminated. He made a few more appearances with PWG until early 2016 before he was banned from working in the US for five years due to not having a work visa.

Progress Wrestling (2016–2019)
Bailey worked several matches for Progress Wrestling, first of them being a loss against Mark Haskins for the Smash Wrestling Championship at Smash/Progress Smash vs. Progress, a cross-over event held between the two promotions on August 7, 2016. at Progress Chapter 95: Still Chasing on September 15, 2019, he participated in a 30-person rumble match for the inaugural Progress Proteus Championship, competing against other wrestlers such as the winner Paul Robinson, Eddie Kingston, Dan Moloney, Sid Scala and Los Federales Santos Jr. At Progress Chapter 78: 24 Hour Progress People on November 11, 2018, he lost a match to Eddie Dennis.

Revolution Pro Wrestling (2016–present)
Bailey worked for the British promotion Revolution Pro Wrestling, having his first match at RevPro High Stakes 2016 on January 16, where he lost to Big Damo. He competed in various matches against popular wrestling figures. He lost to Zack Sabre Jr. at RevPro Live At The Cockpit 13 on February 5, 2017. At RevPro Live In Portsmouth 9 on August 27, 2017, Bailey lost a match to Jeff Cobb. At RevPro Live At The Cockpit 21 on October 10, 2017, Bailey lost to Zack Gibson. At RevPro Monday Night Mayhem on October 23, 2017, he unsuccessfully challenged Josh Bodom for the RPW British Cruiserweight Championship. At RevPro Summer Sizzler 2019 on August 30, he participated in a six-man scramble match also involving the winner Sanada, Hikuleo, Robbie Eagles, Rocky Romero and Senza Volto. At RevPro Live At The Cockpit 47, Bailey teamed up with Mao as Moonlight Express to win the SWE Tag Team Championship by defeating Deadly Sins (JK Moody and Kane Khan). At RevPro Uprising 2019, on December 15, Bailey teamed up again with Mao, this time scoring a loss against Pretty Deadly (Lewis Howley and Sam Stoker). On November 6, 2021, Bailey defeated Kid Lykos in the first round and pinned Luke Jacobs in a 4-Way Elimination Match to win the 2021 British J Cup.

Ring Of Honor (2019)
Bailey wrestled a match for Ring Of Honor, at ROH Honor United - Bolton, on October 27, 2019, where he fell short to Flamita.

Westside Xtreme Wrestling (2016–2020)

Bailey debuted for the German promotion Westside Xtreme Wrestling on March 10, 2016, at the wXw The Inner Circle, where he first fell short to Kim Ray. In the second match, he teamed up with Tyler Bate in a losing effort to Timothy Thatcher and Big Daddy Walter. He participated in the wXw 16 Carat Gold 2016 Tournament where he lost to Ilja Dragunov on the first night, on March 11, 2016, and on the second night, from March 12, he faced Marty Scurll, Trevor Lee and Angélico in a three-way match. On the third night, on March 13, he teamed up with Will Ospreay in a losing effort to Marty Scurll and Trevor Lee. On September 30, 2016, on the first night of the wXw World Tag Team League 2016, Bailey defeated John Klinger to become the number ont contender for the wXw Unified World Wrestling Championship. On the second night, on October 1, he fell short to the champion, Jurn Simmons. He also participated in the wXw 16 Carat Gold 2017 Tournament, and on the first night, on March 10, 2017, he defeated A. C. H. in a first round match. On the second night, on March 11, he got defeated by Matt Riddle in a quarter-final match. On the third night, he teamed up with ACH to score a victory against Donovan Dijak and J. T. Dunn. At wXw True Colors 2017 on April 8, Bailey battled Jurn Simmons, Walter and Axel Dieter Jr. in a four-way match for the wXw Unified World Wrestling Championship, coming out unsuccessfully. At Road To 16 Carat Gold 2018, on February 25, 2018, Bailey defeated Jay Skillet and Julian Pace in a three-way match semi-final, however, he fell short to Marius Al-Ani in the final, the same night. At wXw 16 Carat Gold 2018 Tournament, Bailey unsuccessfully challenged Bobby Gunns for the wXw Shotgun Championship on the second night, from March 10, and on the third night, a day later, he teamed up with Matt Sydal and Marius Al-Ani in a losing effort to CCK (Chris Brookes and Travis Banks) and Jonah Rock in a six-man tag team match.

Return to PWG (2022–present)
Bailey returned to PWG after a six-year absence as a participant in the 2022 Battle of Los Angeles tournament, where he defeated Bandido in the first round, Wheeler Yuta in the quarterfinals and Buddy Matthews in the semifinals before losing to Daniel Garcia in the final. He rebounded from the loss in the 2023 Battle of Los Angeles, a year later, where he defeated Jordynne Grace in the first round, Shun Skywalker in the quarterfinals, Bryan Keith in the semifinals and Konosuke Takeshita in the final to win the tournament.

Dramatic Dream Team/DDT Pro Wresting (2016–2020)
Bailey debuted for Dramatic Dream Team on August 2, 2016 in a 17-man royal rumble match at DDT U.S.A. ~Ultimate Superstars Action~ Sakabash At The Beach 2016 Drunkers Kingdom, where he wrestled under the name of Mike Tajiri, a parody of the real wrestler Tajiri. He often wrestled alongside members of the Happy Motel stable Konosuke Takeshita and Antonio Honda without being part of the group. They even challenged Damnation (Daisuke Sasaki, Mad Paulie and Tetsuya Endo) for the KO-D 6-Man Tag Team Championship at DDT Sapporo Wrestling Festa ~ DDT Crab ~  on October 10, 2016 but unsuccessfully. He captured his first title in DDT, the KO-D Tag Team Championship by teaming up with Konosuke Takeshita at DDT Osaka Octopus 2016 on December 4, to defeat Damnation (Daisuke Sasaki and Tetsuya Endo). They dropped the titles at DDT Road To Super Arena In Oyodo on January 9, 2017 to Masakatsu Funaki and Yukio Sakaguchi. He won the titles for the second time by teaming with Mao as a part of the Moonlight Express on July 22, 2018 at DDT Summer Vacation 2018, where they defeated Damnation (Mad Paulie and Tetsuya Endo). Bailey unsuccessfully challenged Harashima for the KO-D Openweight Championship at DDT New Year Lottery Special! on January 3, 2017. He is a former Ironman Heavymetalweight Champion, title which he won in the block B of the D-Oh Grand Prix 2019 tournament show from November 30, 2018, where he defeated Konosuke Takeshita. Bailey participates in comedic matches,  produced many times by DDT, such as a five-way loser explosion weapon rumble tag team match from Judgement 2018: DDT 21st Anniversary on March 25, where he teamed up with Mao to defeat Michael Nakazawa and Chinsuke Nakamura, Isami Kodaka and Fuminori Abe, Sanshiro Takagi and Ordinary Man Munenori Sawa, and Smile Squash (Yuko Miyamoto and Soma Takao).

Impact Wrestling (2021–present) 
On October 31, 2021, Bailey signed a contract with Impact Wrestling, offered by Impact executive Scott D'Amore after his match against Josh Alexander at Destiny Wrestling's Raising Hell. D’Amore has confirmed Bailey is expected to debut in the first part of 2022.

Bailey competed on the Hard To Kill pre-show in his debut match in Impact, winning a four-way match against Ace Austin, Laredo Kid, and Chris Bey.

Personal life
In March 2016, the Wrestling Observer Newsletter reported that Bailey got arrested trying to get into the United States to compete for Evolve. He was subsequently banned from entering the country at all for the next five years. The Observer reported that he was in the process of obtaining a Visa through Combat Zone Wrestling at the time of his ban, however the process was going extremely slowly and would have forced him to miss the Evolve booking. He is non-binary and uses he and they pronouns.Bailey has been engaged to fellow wrestler Veda Scott since November 2020. They were married in May 2022.

Championships and accomplishments
Active Advance Pro Wrestling/Kaientai Dojo
Strongest-K Tag Team Championship (1 time) – with Mao
Attack! Pro Wrestling
Attack! 24:7 Championship (2 times)
Capital City Championship Combat
C4 Championship (2 times)
C4 Tag Team Championship (1 time) – with Kevin Steen
C4 Underground Championship (1 time) 
Snowbrawl Tournament (2014)
Combat Revolution Wrestling
CRW ITV Championship (1 time)
Combat Zone Wrestling
Best of the Best 14 (2015)  
DDT Pro-Wrestling
Ironman Heavymetalweight Championship (1 time)
KO-D Tag Team Championship (2 times) – with Mao (1) and Konosuke Takeshita (1)
DNA Grand Prix (2016)
Grand Sumo Tournament (2019)
Hogtown Pro Wrestling
HPW Openweight Championship (1 time)
Impact Wrestling
 Impact X Division Championship (1 time)
Impact Year End Awards (2 times)
 X Division Star of the Year (2022)
 Match of the Year (2022) 
International Wrestling Syndicate
IWS World Heavyweight Championship (2 times)
Monteregie Wrestling Federation
MWF Junior Championship (1 time)
MWF Regional Championship (1 time)
MWF Tag Team Championship (1 time) – with Alex Silva
North Shore Pro Wrestling
Standing 8 Tournament (2016)
Pro Wrestling Guerrilla
Battle of Los Angeles (2023)
 Pro Wrestling Illustrated
 Ranked No. 30 of the top 500 singles wrestlers in the PWI 500 in 2022
Revolution Pro Wrestling/Southside Wrestling Entertainment
SWE Tag Team Championship (1 time) – with Mao
British J Cup (2021)
Smash Wrestling
The Northern Tournament (2019)

References

External links 

 
 
 

1990 births
21st-century professional wrestlers
Canadian male professional wrestlers
Living people
Professional wrestlers from Quebec
People from Laval, Quebec
TNA/Impact X Division Champions
Ironman Heavymetalweight Champions
KO-D Tag Team Champions
Strongest-K Tag Team Champions